Stardust (Lambda-Zero) is a fictional character appearing in the comic books published by Marvel Comics and existing in that company's Marvel Universe. Stardust is one of the many Heralds of Galactus. Unlike most of Galactus's Heralds, Stardust seeks to kill all who attempt to escape the planets that Galactus feeds upon, an action that Galactus neither requires nor forbids.

This Stardust should not be confused with the other Marvel character known as Stardust, a former enemy of Rom the Spaceknight.

Fictional character biography
The Ethereal Lambda-Zero, who later became known as Stardust, the Herald of Galactus, was first introduced in the comics series Stormbreaker: The Saga of Beta Ray Bill. The first planet Stardust fed to Galactus was New Korbin, after she slaughtered most of the planet's inhabitants.

This led to a series of confrontation with Beta Ray Bill, who was busy attempting to rescue the Korbinites. The two fought each other, and after the first confrontation, Stardust sought out Bill after he obtained the Meta-Orb. Planning on crushing Bill with it, the two fought each other until Stardust opened a portal to a dimension filled with the most evil beings of the universe hoping to trap Bill there. Bill managed to escape, but a being named Asteroth escaped and began destroying entire worlds. Stardust and Bill joined forces, with Stardust using his powers to open a black hole behind Asteroth hoping to lock Asteroth in it. However, Asteroth resisted and the hole instead sucked both Stardust and Bill to a near death.

Galactus had empowered Ray to help Stardust take down her opponent. With the black hole still open, Ray managed to do this, but in return was together with Asteroth sucked into the hole. Stardust has returned off-panel through unknown means, evident by her presence in Annihilation.

Annihilation
Stardust is sent by Galactus to ask the Silver Surfer to meet with Galactus. Stardust meanwhile is under orders to help the other remaining former heralds Red Shift and Firelord as they combat the Annihilation wave fleet. Later the three heralds join with Nova's United Front and defeat and capture one of Annihilus' queens. With the Silver Surfer and Galactus now captured and Firelord half-dead, Stardust and Red Shift are the only two active heralds.

Stardust and Red Shift were presumed dead after holding back a massive energy blast from Galactus' absorbing device. Stardust has since returned.

It is later revealed that Stardust is an Ethereal, a race of beings of pure energy, and that being imbued with the Power Cosmic, in effect, made Stardust indestructible, allowing her to reconstitute herself if "destroyed". She was then confronted by the last fifty-three members of their race, who were nearly made extinct by the Annihilation Wave. Accusing Stardust of treason for leaving them, they attacked Stardust, and in the ensuing battle Stardust "kills" the remaining members of their race in self-defense, and then absorbs the remainder of their living energies. However, she then finds Galactus and, distraught that she has been replaced as a Herald by the Silver Surfer, gives up the remains of her race to feed Galactus, against their protests; an act that surprises Galactus, as no herald has ever willingly given up its race to him. Stardust is then named Galactus's second herald, as Galactus's now increased hunger requires more worlds to devour. It is also then revealed that Galactus is the only creature that Stardust will ever love.

Gender clarification
When she first revealed her existence, Stardust claimed that she existed as pure cosmic energy, making it hard to say whether Stardust is a male or female.  Stardust was also referred to as "he" in Stormbreaker, the character's first appearance,  but a particular reference to Stardust in Fantastic Four makes the character appear to be female,. Later writers would make Stardust female, reflected by her appearance in The Super Hero Squad Show voiced by Cheryl Hines.

Powers and abilities
Stardust is a Herald of Galactus imbued with the Power Cosmic and as such possesses high levels of superhuman strength, durability, reflexes, and stamina to confront and match powerhouses such as Beta Ray Bill as well as the other standard abilities of a Herald, such as creating a black hole or opening inter-dimensional portals. Stardust is an Ethereal, a race of beings of pure energy. Being imbued with the Power Cosmic makes Stardust immortal, allowing her to reconstitute herself if "destroyed", such as during the Annihilation Wave or having its physical structure dispersed.

In other media

Television
 Stardust appears in The Super Hero Squad Show episode "Last Exit Before Doomsday" voiced by Cheryl Hines. She arrives on Earth while looking for Silver Surfer. Stardust ends up captured by Doctor Doom's minions as Doctor Doom forces them to take him to Galactus.
 Stardust appears in The Avengers: Earth's Mightiest Heroes episode "Avengers Assemble." She appears as one of Galactus's four heralds and is depicted as a creature composed of Sentient Water, rendering her a representative of the element of water. Stardust oversaw the construction of a device in the ocean that would help Galactus consume the Earth. She ended up fighting a team of superheroes consisting of Human Torch, Wasp, Wolverine, Thing, and Hawkeye. She was destroyed by the combined attacks of Human Torch and Wasp.

References

Bibliography
 Stormbreaker: The Saga of Beta Ray Bill #1 (March 2005)
 Annihilation: Silver Surfer #2–3 (July–August 2006)
 Annihilation #1–3 (October–December 2006)
 Annihilation: Heralds of Galactus #1 (April 2007)

External links
 
 Stardust's profile on The Appendix to the Marvel Handbook
 Stardust at the Marvel Database
 "What is a herald of Galactus?" on Flickscribe.com
 http://marvel.wikia.com/wiki/Lambda-Zero_(Earth-616)

Marvel Comics aliens
Marvel Comics characters with superhuman strength
Fictional androgynes
Fictional characters with superhuman durability or invulnerability